Iota Horologii b (ι Hor b / ι Horologii b), often catalogued HR 810 b, is an extrasolar planet approximately 56.5 light-years away in the constellation of Horologium (the Pendulum Clock).

Detection and discovery
The discovery of Iota Horologii b was the result of a long-term survey of forty Solar analog stars that was begun in November 1992. The planet represents the first discovery of an extrasolar planet with a European Southern Observatory instrument, with the data found at the La Silla Observatory in Chile.

The Keplerian signal found the planet to have an orbital period of 320.1 days, indicative of an orbiting planet with minimum mass of 2.26 Jupiter masses. Iota Horologii b was announced in the summer of 1999 as the first planet found by a team of planet hunters led by Martin Kürster.

The measurements of Iota Horologii show that the planet orbits the star approximately every 320 days. From this period, the known mass of the central star (1.25 solar masses) and the amplitude of the velocity changes, a mass of at least 2.26 times that of planet Jupiter is deduced for the planet.

It revolves around the host star in a somewhat elongated orbit. If it were located in the Solar System, this orbit would stretch from just outside the orbit of Venus (at 117 million km or 0.78 astronomical units [AU] from the Sun) to just outside the orbit of the Earth (at 162 million km or 1.08 AU). Because the planet is about 2,000 more massive than the Earth, it is predicted that Iota Horologii b is more similar to planet Jupiter.

Preliminary astrometric analysis of Iota Horologii b suggested that planet b may have as much as 24 times the mass of Jupiter with an inclination of 5.5 degrees from Earth's line of sight. With these calculations, Iota Horologii b may actually be an extremely dim brown dwarf and a substellar companion of Iota Horologii. However, these measurements were later proved useful only for upper limits of inclination.

References

External links 
 
 

Horologium (constellation)
Giant planets
Exoplanets discovered in 1999
Exoplanets detected by radial velocity
Exoplanets detected by astrometry